Alwaleed Philanthropies (formerly the "Al Waleed bin Talal Foundation") is a charitable and philanthropic organization founded by Al-Waleed bin Talal. The foundation has established centers and programs at institutions of higher education around the world. In 2016, Lamia bint Majed Al Saud was appointed as secretary general.

References

External links

2003 establishments in Saudi Arabia
Organizations established in 2003
Charities based in Saudi Arabia
International development agencies
Medical and health organisations based in Saudi Arabia